Titu in Iran, may refer to:
 Titu-ye Pain